Upper motor neurons (UMNs) is a term introduced by William Gowers in 1886. They are found in the cerebral cortex and brainstem and carry information down to activate interneurons and lower motor neurons, which in turn directly signal muscles to contract or relax. UMNs in the cerebral cortex are the main source of voluntary movement. 

They are the larger pyramidal cells in the cerebral cortex. There is a type of giant pyramidal cell called Betz cells and are found just below the surface of the cerebral cortex within layer V of the primary motor cortex. The cell bodies of Betz cell neurons are the largest   in the brain, approaching nearly 0.1 mm in diameter.

The primary motor cortex, or precentral gyrus, is the most posterior gyrus of the frontal lobe and lies anterior to the central sulcus.  The pyramidal cells of the precentral gyrus are also called upper motor neurons.  The fibers of the upper motor neurons project out of the precentral gyrus ending in the brainstem, where they will decussate (intersect) within the lower medulla oblongata to form the lateral corticospinal tract on each side of the spinal cord.  The fibers that do not decussate will pass through the medulla and continue on to form the anterior corticospinal tracts.  The upper motor neuron descends in the spinal cord to the level of the appropriate spinal nerve root.  At this point, the upper motor neuron synapses with the lower motor neuron, each of whose axons innervate a fiber of skeletal muscle.

These neurons connect the brain to the appropriate level in the spinal cord, from which point nerve signals continue to the muscles by means of the lower motor neurons.  The neurotransmitter glutamate transmits the nerve impulses from upper to lower motor neurons, where it is detected by glutamatergic receptors.

Pathways
Upper motor neurons travel in several neural pathways through the central nervous system (CNS):

Lesions
Any upper motor neuron lesion, also known as pyramidal insufficiency, occurs in the neural pathway above the anterior horn of the spinal cord. Such lesions can arise as a result of stroke, multiple sclerosis, spinal cord injury or other acquired brain injury. The resulting changes in muscle performance that can be wide and varied are described overall as upper motor neuron syndrome. Symptoms can include muscle weakness, decreased motor control including a loss of the ability to perform fine movements, increased vigor (and decreased threshold) of spinal reflexes including spasticity, clonus (involuntary, successive cycles of contraction/relaxation of a muscle), and an extensor plantar response known as the Babinski sign.

See also
 Lower motor neuron
 Upper motor neuron lesion
 Lower motor neuron lesion

References

External links
 

Cerebral palsy types
Motor system
Efferent neurons